El Arroyo is a Mexican restaurant located on West 5th Street in Austin, Texas. The restaurant is known for its humorous marquee.

History
El Arroyo was established in 1975 by Bob and Mary Ogden, the land owners.  Clay McPhail and Doug English, who owned the restaurant for 25 years until 2012, when it was sold to Ellis and Paige Winstanley, who met when Paige got a job at Cain & Able's, a bar owned by Ellis. After "a while" the two started dating and formed a business partnership.

Menu
The restaurant serves typical Mexican cuisine including tacos, fajitas, guacamole and tortilla chips in "gargantuan" portions.

Marquee
The restaurant is known for its humorous marquee, which attempts to "toe the line" between "uplifting, snarky, and of-the-moment". The messages on the marquee are the result of a group effort among 15 people including the owners and restaurant managers. The marquee has inspired its own line of merchandise such as jigsaw puzzles and yard signs.

References

1975 establishments in Texas
Companies based in Austin, Texas
Restaurants established in 1975
Mexican restaurants in Texas